Wilhelm Tell II (January 1, 1980- 2008) or Wilhelm Tell, was a black Hanoverian foaled in Germany. He was sired by Wedekind, out of Donauliese.

Life and career
Wilhelm Tell was foaled on January 1, 1980 in Germany. He was sired by Wedekind, out of the mare Donauliese. His highest recorded free jump was 6'5.

Wilhelm Tell II was imported to the United States in 1985 from Niedersaches Landgestut Celle as a breeding stallion. After that, his main use was to be a stud horse.

He died in the summer of 2008 due to cancer.

Pedigree
Being the colt of Wedekind and Donauliese, Wilhelm Tell II is a full brother to Wilhelm Tell I. Wilhelm Tell I is the sire of the 2002 Olympic dressage team member, Flim Flam with partner Sue Blinks.

References 

Hanoverian horses
Show jumping horses
Animal deaths from cancer